Dana or Danah Al-Nasrallah (born 7 March 1988) is Kuwaiti female track and field athlete competing in sprinting events. In 2004, she became the first Kuwaiti female Olympic competitor.

References

External links
 

1988 births
Living people
Kuwaiti female sprinters
Olympic athletes of Kuwait
Athletes (track and field) at the 2004 Summer Olympics
Athletes (track and field) at the 2006 Asian Games
Sportspeople from Kuwait City
Asian Games competitors for Kuwait
Olympic female sprinters
20th-century Kuwaiti women
21st-century Kuwaiti women